Grace Episcopal Church is an historic Episcopal church located at 315 Wayne Street in Sandusky, Ohio, in the United States. On October 20, 1982, it was added to the National Register of Historic Places.

History
Grace Episcopal Church was organized on March 15, 1835. The church building dates from 1843.

Current use
Grace Episcopal Church is still an active parish in the Episcopal Diocese of Ohio.  The current priest-in-charge is Rev. Jan Smith Wood.

See also

 List of Registered Historic Places in Erie County, Ohio
 Grace Episcopal Church (disambiguation)

References

External links
 National Register listings for Erie County, Ohio
 Grace Episcopal Church website
 Grace Episcopal Church history

National Register of Historic Places in Erie County, Ohio
Churches on the National Register of Historic Places in Ohio
Episcopal churches in Ohio
Churches in Sandusky, Ohio
Churches in Erie County, Ohio